Following is a list of dates in the history of Sunderland, the ancient city in North East England. Facts and figures, important dates in Sunderland's history.

Sunderland was famous for ship building

Early times

 674 CE – Building of St. Peter's Church.
 1069 – Edgar Ætheling sailed for Scotland from Wearmouth.
 1183 – Bishop Hugh du Puiset's charter creates the first Borough of Sunderland
 1346
 Thomas Menvil authorised to build ships at Hendon
 The first recorded shipbuilding on the River Wear

17th & 18th centuries

 1634 – Bishop Morton's Charter created Sunderland's first Mayor and Corporation.

 1698 – Formation of Sunderland Company of Glassmakers
 1669 – Letters patent permitted the erection of a pier and lighthouse.
 1719 – Sunderland Parish's Holy Trinity Church opened
 1793 – Philip and John Laing established a shipyard on Monkwearmouth Shore.  (The oldest surviving shipbuilding firm in Sunderland when it was absorbed into Sunderland Shipbuilders Ltd.)
 1795 – Birth of Sir Henry Havelock at Ford Hall in Bishopwearmouth. 
 1796 – Wearmouth Bridge opened.

19th century

 1822 – Opening of the railway line from Hetton to Sunderland coal staithes, one of the earliest uses of locomotive power. The engineer was George Stephenson.
 1826 – Sinking of Wearmouth Colliery
 1826 – (15 June) Birth of Harry Watts, a Sunderland diver who rescued over 40 people from drowning – and assisted in the rescue of another 120 people.
 1831 – (October); the first UK outbreak of cholera occurred in Sunderland – 200 people died.
 1832 – Sunderland became a parliamentary borough under the Reform Act, returning two members of Parliament.
 1835 – St Mary's Church, Sunderland completed.
 1835/6 – Establishment of the modern Borough Council, with the first modern Mayor
 1850 – Opening of the South Docks by George Hudson MP
 1856 – Birth of Sir William Mills, (1856 – 1932) inventor of the WW1 Mills bomb
 1858
 The tongue of 'Big Ben' was forged at Hopper's foundry, Houghton
 Wearmouth Bridge widened under the direction of Robert Stephenson. 
 1873 – Foundation of the Sunderland Echo
 1875 – A record of 64 days was set for the run to Australia by the Wear built sailing vessel The Torrens.  Launched in 1875, the novelist Joseph Conrad served on her for a time as mate
 1879
 Sunderland A.F.C. was founded by Thomas Allen as Sunderland and District Teachers Association Football Club
 Sunderland station opened.
 1888 – Sunderland granted County Borough status
 1890 – Sunderland Town Hall opened.
 1891 – Population: 131,686.
 1892 – Sunderland A.F.C. win the Football League Championship
 1893 – Sunderland A.F.C. win the Football League Championship
 1895 – Sunderland A.F.C. win the Football League Championship
 1900 – Sunderland Corporation Tramways started.

20th century

 1901 – Population: 146,077.
 1902 – Sunderland A.F.C. win the Football League Championship
 1903 – Roker Pier – the harbour's northern breakwater is opened at 2,790 feet long.  
 1909 – The then heaviest bridge in Britain was opened. The Queen Alexandra Bridge carried road and rail traffic, the railway deck remained in use for barely 12 years
 1913 – Sunderland AFC win the Football League Championship
 1923 – Police Boxes, model for the TARDIS pioneered by Chief Constable Frederick Crawley
 1936 – Sunderland A.F.C. win the Football League Championship
 1937 – Sunderland A.F.C. win the FA Cup
 1954 – Sunderland Corporation Tramways closed.
 1964 – Washington designated as a New Town
 1967 – Ryhope, Silksworth, Tunstall, East & Middle Herrington, South Hylton, part of Offerton, Castletown and Whitburn South Bents added to the County Borough of Sunderland
 1969 – Sunderland Technical & Art Colleges merged to form Sunderland Polytechnic (now the University of Sunderland)
 1970 – Opening of new Basil Spence-designed Sunderland Civic Centre by the Princess Margaret
 1971 – Sunderland Town Hall demolished.
 1973 – Sunderland A.F.C. win the FA Cup for the second time
 1974 – Washington, Hetton-le-Hole and Houghton-le-Spring become part of the new Borough of Sunderland
 1978 – First Wearside Jack hoax letter sent to West Yorkshire Police
 1984 – Nissan chose Sunderland for their new European manufacturing base
 1986 – Abolition of Tyne and Wear County Council increases Sunderland Council's powers and duties
 1988 – Announcement of closure of the shipyards on Wearside
 1992 – The City of Sunderland was created a by the Queen on 23 March
 1993 – The Queen and the Duke of Edinburgh visit Sunderland to unveil the city's new coat of arms
 1997 – Stadium of Light opens

21st century

 2001 – The entire council housing stock of 39,000 homes is transferred to private landlord Gentoo after a referendum of tenants found 95% support in favour of the move
 2008 – Sunderland Aquatic Centre opens, the only Olympic-sized pool between Glasgow and Leeds, on a site adjacent to the Stadium of Light

References

Further reading
Published in the 19th century
 
 
 
 
 
 
 
 

Published in the 20th century
 
 
 

City of Sunderland
History of Tyne and Wear
Sunderland
Sunderland